Ezekiel Judah, (Hebrew:  יחזקאל יהודה) or Yehezkel Yehuda or Yahuda or Ezekiel Judah Jacob Sliman (1800 – 22 April 1860) was a Jewish communal leader, indigo, muslin and silk trader, philanthropist and talmudist of Baghdad, who migrated to India, leading the Baghdadi Jewish community of Kolkata in his lifetime and establishing the city's first synagogues.

Origins

Ezekiel Judah was the scion of a noble Jewish family of Baghdad, known as the Judah family in English, Yehuda family in Hebrew, or originally as the Ma'tuk family.

The Ma’tuk family of Baghdad were descended from Rabbi Ma’tuk, the last Nasi or Prince of the Jewish community of Anah, on the Euphrates, who fled to Baghdad with his family in the first quarter of the 17th century following the threats of a tyrannical governor who had persecuted the community. Rabbi Ma’tuk, as was the custom for leaders of leading Jewish communities in Iraq at the time, had been the Saraf-Bashi or Treasurer of the governor. The historian of Baghdad Jewry Rabbi David Solomon Sassoon says the Ma’tuk family has been established in Anah for centuries.

The family's flight reflected a shift in the axis of Mesopotamian Jews. The historian of Iraqi Jewry Zvi Yehuda says the conflict between the Ottoman Empire and Persia harmed Anah and the cessation of the caravan trade between Aleppo and Baghdad impoverished the Jewish community, seeing many of the wealthiest Jewish families like the Ma’tuks depart for Baghdad. Anah, which has previously been a prosperous Jewish centre fell into sharp decline with a Portuguese traveller in 1663 even observing there were only Jews who lived there who made their livelihoods out of making clothe out of camel hair.

Despite this, origins in Anah, were in fact seen as a sign of family's antiquity amongst Iraqi Jews at the time. This was due to the ancient Iraqi Jewish belief Anah was the site of Nehardea, which features prominently in the Talmud, including as the first seat of the Exhilarch and his Beth din. The Jews of Anah maintained a belief they were descended from the Babylonian Exile and never subsequently returned to Palestine. The descendants of the Ma'tuk family from Anah, known as the Judah family since the late 18th century, maintain this tradition to this day. That this belief was native to this time is corroborated by Christians missionnaires in Anah in the 19th century who reported "these Jews maintained their forefathers were of the first captivity, and had never returned to Palestine."

The family's arrival in Baghdad reflected a revival of that city's fortunes. Baghdad, having been extinguished as a Jewish centre following its capture by Timur in the 14th century was re-emerging as a major Jewish centre when the family arrived in the early 17th century. According to historian Zvi Yehuda, the 15th century sees no reports on Jews in Baghdad or in its surroundings, in Basra, Hilla, Kifil, Anah, Kurdistan, even in Persia and the Persian Gulf. The migration of the Ma’tuk family to Baghdad was one part of the city's incipient Jewish revival. According to the historian and Rabbi David Solomon Sassoon the family were one of the oldest Jewish families of Baghdad. The 19th-century German ethnographer H. Peterman corroborated writing that the oldest Jewish families of Baghdad came from Anah, amongst them the Ma’tuk. Historians of Iraqi Jewry recount that the Ma’tuk or later Yehuda or Judah family achieved great renown as scholars, rabbis, merchants and communal leaders, in Baghdad in the 18th and 19th century including most prominently through the communal leader, poet and astronomer Sliman Ben David Ma’tuk, also is also known to historians under the Anglicised name as Solomon Ma’tuk.

Biography 

Ezekiel Judah, born in 1799 or 1800, is referred to by historians or on monuments in the Calcutta synagogues he erected alternately as Ezekiel Judah, Yehezkel Yehuda or Yahuda, or Ezekiel Judah Jacob Sliman or Sulliman. These three different names reflects a moment in time where the emerging Baghdadi Jewish trading diaspora in Asia still used the traditional Jewish naming system of listing a name simply as the first name of a son, father and grandfather for religious and communal purposes but was slowly evolving towards using the Western custom of surnames as families began to travel internationally and engage with the British Empire.

However, Iraqi Jewish historians cite the Ma’tuk clan, descended from Rabbi Ma’tuk of Anah, as having adopted his name as a name of their clan or a form of surname at least by the mid 17th century if not earlier. According to the chronicler of Iraqi Jewish history Efrayim Haddad, Rabbi Judah Jacob Ma’tuk was the father of Ezekiel Judah. In his lifetime the family name was changed to the Yehuda or Judah family, as it was later Anglicised in British India. The name Ezekiel Judah Jacob Sulliman, as appears on Neveh Shalom synagogue in Calcutta, is his first name coupled with that of his father and grandfather, without a surname.

According to the historian of Iraqi Jewry Abraham Ben-Jacob, "amongst the lords of Baghdad at this time the Judah family (Ma’tuk) occupied a prominent place." Rabbi Judah Jacob married twice and was the father of eight sons and two daughters. His eldest son Ezekiel Judah was "the best of his sons" and became the founder of the Judah family of India. He was seen as the bearer of an aristocratic name of Baghdadi Jews by his contemporaries and was respected by them as a descendant of the renowned Sliman ben David Matuk of Baghdad. He was also a relative of the chief of the powerful merchant and unofficial leader of the Baghdadi Jewish trading diaspora David Sassoon. Historian Abraham Ben-Jacob and the Encyclopedia of the Founders and Builders of Israel refers to Ezekiel Judah as a rabbi.

Ezekiel Judah married twice. His first wife was Rachel Haim the daughter of Rabbi Moshe Haim who renewed Torah scholarship in Baghdad. Rabbi Moshe Haim was both the father in law of David Sassoon and Ezekiel Judah creating a family bond between the Judahs and the Sassoons. His second wife was Khatoon Gubbay, the daughter of Rabbi Aaron Saleh Gubbay or Hakham, as the title was referred amongst Mizrahi Jews at the time, the Av Beth Din, or deputy head of the supreme Jewish religious court of Baghdad.

The Encyclopaedia of the Founders and Builders of Israel, compiled and published by David Tidhar cites that Ezekiel Judah was himself a great Torah scholar, held a yeshiva and educated the poor with one of his students being the renowned Eliyahu Mani, later to be the Rabbi of Hebron. Accounts vary as to the year Ezekiel Judah established his family permanently in Calcutta. The date of his first arrival in the city is 1820 but according to Rabbi Ezekiel N. Musleah, the last Rabbi of the Jewish community of Calcutta, the year he moved definitively to Bengal was 1838. Ezekiel Judah and members of the Judah family migrated to India in the context of the persecution of the Jews and misrule of Dawud Pasha of Baghdad.

Iraqi Jewish historian Abraham Ben-Jacob says the flight of David Sassoon from Baghdad prompted his friend Ezekiel Judah to do the same, travelling with his son Sassoon Judah to India. At first he lived in Bombay and later migrated to Calcutta. His wife subsequently joined him two years later with their son Nissim travelling the long journey to India by donkey.

Ezekiel Judah appears to have by trade been a leading indigo, silk and muslin trader. On the back of this fortune as a philanthropist, Ezekiel Judah established the first synagogue in Calcutta, known as Neveh Shalom in Hebrew, which translates as the Abode of Peace, in 1825. He co-founded the second synagogue Beth-El, in 1856 with David Joseph Ezra.

Ezekiel Judah and the Judah family are described in the epic travelogue of the Ashkenazi Jewish writer J. J. Benjamin.  Describing the community of Calcutta, using the term then in use amongst Mizrahi Jews to refer to a rabbi, he wrote, "they are all well educated, but have no appointed Chachamim; one of the richest commercial men of the town Ezekiel Jehuda Jacob Sliman, a very enlightened man and an excellent talmudist, performs the duties of the Chacham." J. J. Benjamin described his visit to Singapore that the elders of the small community there were the sons of Ezekiel Judah.

Ezekiel Judah's enlightened views can be seen in his view towards the Bene Israel, whom many other Baghdadi Jews sought to separate from and exclude from their synagogues on account of their darker skin and being native to India. In 1843, Ezekiel Judah wrote to the Rabbis of Baghdad concerning the Bene Israel. He wrote, "they give birth to sons and circumcise them as we do, they teach them Talmud-Torah with our children. They are exactly as we, without any difference, and we always call them to the Sefer Torah in accordance with the custom of the Jewish people. May we give them our daughters and may we take their daughters?" Sadly no record of the response to Ezekiel Judah survives.

In Calcutta Ezekiel Judah, as in Bombay like his relative David Sassoon, sought to align the Baghdadi Jewish community with the British and be seen to publicly support the colonial power, eventually become a naturalised British subject.

Ezekiel Judah died on 22 April 1860 in Calcutta, having not reached his sixtieth year. He is buried in Calcutta. For a year after Ezekiel Judah's death his sons invited Rabbis from Baghdad, Jerusalem and Syria and the poor Jews of Calcutta to study Torah day and night at his former home.

Legacy 
After the death of Ezekiel Judah two branches of the Judah or Yehuda family developed, a rabbinical one settling in Jerusalem and a mercantile one remaining in Calcutta and eventually migrating to London after the end of British rule.

Yehuda Family of Jerusalem

One of Ezekiel Judah's sons by his first marriage was described as a leader amongst the Jewish community in Baghdad. Another by his first marriage, Rabbi Shlomo Yehezkel Yehuda migrated from Baghdad to Jerusalem. In doing so he founded a rabbinical branch of the family known as the Yehuda family of Jerusalem. Rabbi Shlomo Yehezkel Yehuda was bequeathed by his father Ezekiel Judah a share a share in houses in Calcutta worth £25,000 and was thus able to live a life of great wealth and respectability, thanks to the income derived from their rental, of which he set aside a considerable sum for philanthropy. His migration to Jerusalem was described by his descendant David Yellin.

Upon arriving in Jerusalem Rabbi Shlomo Yehezkel Yehuda set aside one room of his home for ten students to study Torah throughout the day, often studied with them and established a scholarship fund for their welfare. Thanks to the fortune of his father Ezekiel Judah, Rabbi Shlomo Yehezkel Yehuda played an important role in building the Sephardic Jewish community and rabbinical infrastructure in Jerusalem. He established the yeshiva Knesset Yehezkel, named in honour of his father, in 1858, which he maintained with a large fortune he inherited from his father in Calcutta. After the death of Rabbi Shlomo Yehezkel Yehuda the yeshiva was merged with Hesed El yeshiva founded in 1860.

Ezekiel Judah's grandson and son of Rabbi Shlomo Yehezkel Yehuda was Rabbi Faraj Haim Yehuda, who was born in 1846 in Baghdad. Rabbi Faraj Haim Yehuda was one of the main builders of the Sephardi community in Jerusalem in the late 19th century. He was one of the founders of the Shimon HaTzaddik quarter, a Jerusalem neighborhood established in 1875 by the Eidah Sephardit Committee. In 1882, Rabbi Faraj Haim Yehuda left for India to seek funds from wealthy relatives and the Baghdadi Jewish community established there for the Shimon HaTzaddik synagogue, visiting Bombay. On his return in 1885 he founded the Adat HaBavlim association for Iraqi Jews in Jerusalem with his brother Rabbi Binyamin Yehuda. He was also a known scholar and his book VaTitpallel Hanna was printed in 1889 in Jerusalem and contains prayers, ethics and laws. Rabbi Faraj Chaim Yehuda departed again for India in 1893, dying on his return to Jerusalem in his native city of Baghdad.

During his lifetime Rabbi Shlomo Yehezkel Yehuda became close with Ashkenazi scholars. Soon after his arrival Rabbi Shlomo Yehezkel Yehuda stunned deeply conservative Jerusalem religious society in 1854 when he married his daughter Sarah to Joshua Yellin, an Ashkenazi Jew and the son of Polish immigrants. The marriage occurred about four months after Joshua Yellin's Bar Mitzvah. Marriages between Sephardic and Ashkenazi Jews were extremely rare at the time. The Yehuda and Yellin families joined forces to establish the first modern Jewish agricultural colony in Palestine at Motza a few years later. Members of the Yellin family lived in Motza which is today one of the most sought after locations on the approach to Jerusalem. The family at one point aspired but failed to settle Yemenite Jewish immigrants in Motza. The father of Joshua Yellin, David Tavya Yellin, and his father-in-law Rabbi Shlomo Yehezkel Yehuda, bought the land at Motza in 1860 from the Arabs of Qalunya. The historic Yellin family house was built by Joshua Yellin and his family's primary residence in 1890.

David Yellin, the son of Joshua Yellin and Sarah Yellin, would become one of the central figures of the revival of the modern Hebrew language and a Hebrew poet. He was founder of the Hebrew Language Committee in 1890 upon which the modern Academy of the Hebrew Language is based, taught at the Hebrew University of Jerusalem and was a Zionist politician in Ottoman and Mandatory Palestine. David Yellin was from 1903 to 1912 a member of the Jerusalem Municipal Council and from 1905 to 1920 President of the Jewish National Council and deputy mayor of Jerusalem. The Yellins, as descendants of Ezekiel Judah, were viewed as scions of the Sassoon family by their contemporaries.

The Yehuda family of Jerusalem continued to actively trade with the Judah family in Calcutta, their wealthy relatives in India throughout the 19th century. Their trade consisted of Indian products such as tea and indigo. The son of Rabbi Shlomo Yehezkel Yehuda grew close to the Chabad movement in Jerusalem, was known as the Hassid and received support from wealthy relatives in India to repair the second floor of the Chabad synagogue in the Old City. The Chabad synagogue of the Old City, known as Tzemach Tzedek, was built in 1858 with the support of David Sassoon, the second story and a yeshiva being added in 1879 with the support of Elias Sassoon.

According to the Encyclopaedia of the Founders and the Builders of Israel, Rabbi Binyamin Yehuda, the son of Rabbi Shlomo Yehezkel Yehuda, died after a collapse in the capital of himself and his brothers meant he was no longer able to distribute alms to the poor as was his custom and "out of grief he fell asleep from which he did not arise." His sons included the biblical scholar Abraham Shalom Yahuda.

Judah Family of Calcutta

The mercantile branch of the family remained in India and was known as the Yehuda and subsequently when the name was anglicised during British rule, the Judah family of Calcutta. According to the historian of the Baghdadi Jewish trading diaspora Ezra Yehzkel-Shaked, one of Ezekiel Judah's sons by his second marriage, Yosef Yehuda, who remained in India, was described as the "king of the Calcutta opium exchange" and the owner of a "famed sailing vessel" which made regular voyages from India to Macao and other destinations in China.

Calcutta Synagogues

In terms of Ezekiel Judah's physical legacy the Calcutta synagogues of Neveh Shalom and Beth El remain standing and maintained in the city, whose Jewish community has dwindled to less than twenty people. Despite this they are regularly visited by tourists descendants of the Baghdadi Jewish community and considered a unique part of the city's heritage. Given the almost complete destruction of Jewish heritage sites in Syria and Iraq, Ben Judah has noted these age amongst "the last or our synagogues" built in the traditional Baghdadi style.

Descendants

Ezekiel Judah's descendants included Abraham Yahuda (1877–1951) from the Jerusalem branch and Tim Judah and his son Ben Judah from the Calcutta branch.

References 

1800 births
1860 deaths
Iraqi Jews
Talmudists